Dave Cartlidge (born 9 April 1940) is an English footballer, who played as a wing half in the Football League for Chester.

References

Chester City F.C. players
Bradford City A.F.C. players
Association football wing halves
English Football League players
Leicester City F.C. players
1940 births
Living people
Footballers from Leicester
English footballers